Ronald Brunmayr (born 17 February 1975) is an Austrian football manager and a former player who is assistant head coach at Eintracht Frankfurt.

Club career
In August 1994, Brunmayr started his professional career with FC Linz, making his Bundesliga debut, and was signed by Vienna club Austria Wien in 1996. 

In 1998, after two years he moved to SV Ried, and again two years later, in 2000 he moved to Grazer AK, with whom he won a domestic cup, became footballer of the year, and topped Austria's goalscoring charts. 

He then joined Sturm Graz in 2003, then rejoined SV Ried later in 2005, and played for FC Kärnten in 2007, before finishing his professional career at SV Pasching from 2008 to 2010.

International career
In August 2000, Brunmayr made his debut for the Austria national team against Hungary, and earned eight caps, scoring one goal. 

His final international game was a March 2003 friendly match against Scotland.

Career statistics

Honours
Grazer AK
 Austrian Cup: 2001–02

Individual
 Austrian Bundesliga top scorer: 2001–02

References

External links
 Player profile - Austria Archiv
 
 

1975 births
Living people
People from Steyr
Footballers from Upper Austria
Austrian footballers
Association football forwards
Austria international footballers
Austrian Football Bundesliga players
FK Austria Wien players
SV Ried players
Grazer AK players
SK Sturm Graz players
FC Kärnten players
LASK players
FC Juniors OÖ players
Austrian football managers
FC Juniors OÖ managers
FC Blau-Weiß Linz managers